New Street is a road in the city centre of York, in England.

History
The street was planned in 1745.  Two houses were demolished, a derelict one facing Coney Street, and Davy Hall, on Davygate.  It was paved in 1747 and was originally named Cumberland Row.  By the early-19th century, the street was generally known as "New Street".  In 1891, the street was widened, and some buildings at the north-east end of the street were demolished.

In 1805, the Methodist New Street Chapel was opened on the street.  It closed in 1908, becoming the Central Mission, and then from 1910 a variety theatre.  In 1922, it became the Tower Cinema.  It closed in 1966 and was replaced by the Davygate Arcade, which has since also been demolished.

The street is now home to a mixture of shops and bars, with the City of York Council noting that it is a secondary shopping street, with the sides of some buildings facing the street.  The York Mix has noted ongoing issues with alcohol-related disorder on the street, which it describes as "teeming with bars".

Layout and architecture

The street runs south-west, from Davygate to Coney Street.  Much of the south-east side of the street is occupied by 3-9 New Street.  One of the first terraces of identical houses built in the city, it was completed in 1746 and originally consisted of six houses, with four surviving.  1 New Street was built in 1959, in a style to match the terrace.  On the north-west side is 8 New Street, built as a coach house in about 1745, which later served as the engine house of the Yorkshire Insurance Company.

References

Streets in York